Služovice is a municipality and village in Opava District in the Moravian-Silesian Region of the Czech Republic. It has about 800 inhabitants. It is part of the historic Hlučín Region.

Administrative parts
The village of Vrba is an administrative part of Služovice.

History
The first written mention of Služovice is from 1349. The municipalities of Služovice and Vrbka were merged in 1979.

References

External links

Villages in Opava District
Hlučín Region